The  is a new public commemorative event on 28 April, proposed by Japanese Prime Minister Shinzō Abe in 2012 and first formally celebrated in 2013. It marks the end of the American occupation of Japan on 28 April 1952. It has been described as "part of Mr Abe's nationalist campaign" by the BBC.

The 2013 event
The event was held at Kensei Kinenkan Hall in Chiyoda ward, Tokyo. It was attended by Emperor Akihito, Empress Michiko and around three hundred guests.

There were large public demonstrations by Okinawans who regarded it as a "day of disgrace" on which they were "sold off to the U.S. military". The Governor of Okinawa, Hirokazu Nakaima, did not attend, but sent his deputy, Kurayoshi Takara.

References

Anniversaries
Sovereignty
Postwar Japan
Public holidays in Japan